The English Mixed Curling Championship is the national mixed curling championship for England. The championship usually decides which team of curlers is sent to the following season's World Mixed Curling Championship (from 2015) or the European Mixed Curling Championship (before 2015). It has been held annually since 2005. It is organized by the English Curling Association.

Past champions

See also
English Men's Curling Championship
English Women's Curling Championship
English Mixed Doubles Curling Championship

References

Mixed

2005 establishments in England
Recurring sporting events established in 2005
National curling championships
Mixed curling